George Henry Lloyd was an English professional footballer of the early twentieth century.

Born in Derby, he began his professional career with local club Derby County, making ten appearances in The Football League. In 1903 he joined New Brompton of the Southern League, where he played for the next five seasons. He made nearly 150 appearances for the Kent-based club.

References

Year of birth missing
English footballers
Gillingham F.C. players
Derby County F.C. players
Footballers from Derby
Year of death missing
Association football midfielders